The following is a list of films produced in the Kannada film industry in India in 1980, presented in alphabetical order.

See also

Kannada films of 1981
Kannada films of 1979

1980
Kannada
Films, Kannada